The Quänebach  is a river of Saxony, Germany. It flows into the Wiederitz in Zauckerode.

See also
List of rivers of Saxony

Rivers of Saxony
Rivers of Germany